Ann Louise Maria Petrén (born 25 May 1954) is a Swedish actress, and daughter to Folke Petrén and Maud Jacobsson. She was educated at Malmö Theatre Academy and works at Stockholm City Theatre.

In 2003, Petrén received a Guldbagge Award for her role as Anita in the film Om jag vänder mig om, and also the Jarl Kulle-scholarship and the award of Swedish Section of International Association of Theatre Critics.

In 2011, Petrén received a "Guldbagge" for her role in the film Happy End, and she also received Dagens Nyheters kulturpris.

Selected filmography
1986 - I lagens namn
1986 - The Mozart Brothers
1989 - Peter och Petra 
1992 - Night of the Orangutan
2000 - A Summer Tale
2001/2002 - Olivia Twist (TV)
2002 - Outside Your Door
2004 - Dalecarlians
2005 - Mouth to Mouth
2006 - LasseMajas detektivbyrå (TV)
2007 - Beck – Gamen
2011 - Åsa-Nisse – wälkom to Knohult
2020 - Inland

External links

Ann Petrén on the website of Stockholm City Theatre
Ann Petrén on Swedish Movie Database

1954 births
People from Västerås
20th-century Swedish actresses
21st-century Swedish actresses
Living people
Best Actress Guldbagge Award winners